Solidago caesia, commonly named blue-stemmed goldenrod, wreath goldenrod, or woodland goldenrod, is a flowering plant native to North America.

Description
Key identification features include a dark, wiry, blue or purple stem, and flower heads in the leaf axils instead of in a large array at the top of the plant. Prefers medium to part shade, and can often be found in wooded areas.

Distribution
It grows in the central and eastern parts of the continent from Manitoba east to New Brunswick, south as far as Florida and eastern Texas.

References

External links

caesia
Flora of North America
Plants described in 1753
Taxa named by Carl Linnaeus